Usana is a genus of achilid planthoppers in the family Achilidae. There are about 10 described species in Usana.

Species
These 10 species belong to the genus Usana:
 Usana abdominalis Distant, 1916 c g
 Usana aspergilliformis Long, Yang & Chen, 2015 c g
 Usana concava Long, Yang & Chen, 2015 c g
 Usana congjiangensis Long, Yang & Chen, 2015 c g
 Usana demochares Fennah, 1978 c g
 Usana fissura Long, Yang & Chen, 2015 c g
 Usana lineolalis Distant, 1906 c g
 Usana oblongincisa Long, Yang & Chen, 2015 c g
 Usana unispina Long, Yang & Chen, 2015 c g
 Usana yanonis Matsumura, 1914 c g
Data sources: i = ITIS, c = Catalogue of Life, g = GBIF, b = Bugguide.net

References

Further reading

 
 
 
 
 

Achilidae
Auchenorrhyncha genera